Garrattsville is a hamlet (and census-designated place) in Otsego County, New York, United States. It is located in the town of New Lisbon at the intersection of Otsego County Route 16 and New York State Route 51. Butternut Creek flows southwest through the hamlet.

References

Geography of Otsego County, New York
Hamlets in Otsego County, New York